Kananascus is a genus of fungi in the family Trichosphaeriaceae. The genus was circumscribed by Trn Raj in 1984.

References

Sordariomycetes genera
Trichosphaeriales